Boundary Island (Chinese:分界洲) is an island in Lingshui County, Hainan, China, located just off the south-east coast of Hainan Island, between Lingshui and Wanning, in Riyue Bay at .

It is the earliest development of an open uninhabited tourist type area. In 2008 it became a national 4A level scenic spot, and in 2013 was promoted to national 5A-class tourist attraction, becoming China's first.

References

External links

Boundary Island official website (in Chinese)

Islands of Hainan
Tourist attractions in Hainan